A chart with the best selling manga in Japan is published weekly by Oricon. This list includes the manga that reached the number one place on that chart in 2013.

Chart history

References 

2013 manga
2013 in comics
2013